Larabanga is a village in West Gonja district, a district in northwestern Northern Region of Ghana. It is known for its whitewashed adobe Sahelian mosque, said to date from 1421, and which, having been built at the height of the trans-Saharan trade, is reputed to be Ghana's oldest mosque and houses a copy of the Qur'an almost as old.

The village is also known for its Mystic Stone, for its patterned vernacular architecture, and as the entrance to the Mole National Park.

Legend of the Mystic Stone
During British rule, there was a road that was laid near the Larabanga Mosque. A stone was removed during the process to make way for the road. The next day, the stone was found again on the same place it was displaced from. The stone was again removed and the same thing happened the next day. Later, the officials decided to build the road around the stone and it became known as the Mystic Stone.

External links and sources

 Touring Ghana - Northern Region
 geocities.com: Larabanga website

Populated places in the Northern Region (Ghana)